Samuel Gustaf Hermelin (4 April 1744, Stockholm – 4 March 1820) was a Swedish  industrialist, diplomat and cartographer. Samuel Gustaf also belonged to the Swedish nobility. He attended the University of Uppsala for mining. In 1782, he went to the United States to study the mining operations and served as  the first Swedish ambassador to the United States. He eventually moved back to Sweden and owned a mining company in Lapland. Samuel Gustaf was elected a Foreign Honorary Member of the American Academy of Arts and Sciences in 1784. In 1785, he was elected an international member of the American Philosophical Society in Philadelphia.

References

1744 births
1820 deaths
Ambassadors of Sweden to the United States
Fellows of the American Academy of Arts and Sciences
Swedish cartographers
Uppsala University alumni
18th-century Swedish businesspeople
19th-century Swedish businesspeople
Swedish mining businesspeople